ASRock Inc. is a Taiwanese manufacturer of motherboards, industrial PCs and home theater PCs (HTPC). Founded by Ted Hsu, it was founded in 2002 and is currently owned by Taiwanese electronics company Pegatron.

History
ASRock was originally spun off from Asus in 2002 in order to compete with companies like Foxconn for the commodity OEM market. Since then, ASRock has also gained momentum in the DIY sector and plans for moving the company upstream began in 2007 following a successful IPO on the Taiwan Stock Exchange. It was acquired by Pegatron in 2010.

As of 2011, ASRock is the world's third largest motherboard manufacturer, having cooperated with professional esports player Johnathan Wendel in the development of a gaming-oriented enthusiast motherboard in 2011.

ASRock established itself as a server motherboard affiliate in April 2013, having received orders from 10 mid-size clients for server and industrial PC motherboards and forming partnerships with system integrators.

Products and services

Besides motherboards, ASRock also sells desktop minicomputers. Three ASRock products were short-listed for the 2012 Taiwan Brand Award for the first time, and then became endorsed products of the External Trade Development Council when they were promoting the quality image of Taiwan brands globally. In 2012, ASRock stepped into the industrial PC and server motherboard market. ASRock began developing graphics cards in partnership with AMD in 2018 as a result of the surge in cryptocurrency mining.

Market coverage
ASRock is the world's third-largest motherboard brand and the distribution channels cover electronics stores, PC stores, gadget retailers, and online shops. Major sales regions in 2011 included Europe for 37.68%, Central and South America accounted for 21.13%, the Asia Pacific region accounted for 40.95% and other markets accounted for only 0.24%. As a whole, ASRock accounted for a large proportion of sales in Asia and Europe in terms of overall performance.

The Top 3 Motherboard Brand
 Korea: ASRock is the No.1 brand according to the Korea motherboard market share analysis in June 2012 (61% market share).
 Japan: ASRock ranked No.2 in Japan.

Market share overview 

According to the annual report for Digitimes 2011, ASRock has been growing very fast in the past few years. ASRock has been one of the top 3 motherboard brands for 2 consecutive years.

(Note: MSI and ECS' OEM shipments are not included in the figures. Source: Companies and market watchers, compiled by Digitimes, November 2012)

Reception
ASRock received a Tom's Hardware 2012 Recommended Buy Award for their X79 Extreme4 motherboard, and also won the Xbit labs 2012 Editor Recommended Award with Z77 Extreme4. Furthermore, ASRock Z68 Extreme7 Gen3, Fatal1ty Z68 Professional Gen3 and the mini PC series was awarded three 2011 Taiwan Brand Awards.

ASRock is also the first and only manufacturer of a Mini ITX-sized X99 chipset-based motherboard, the X99E-ITX/ac. It supports Haswell-E and Broadwell-E Intel Core i7 and Haswell-EP Intel Xeon CPUs with CPU core support up to 18 cores.

See also 

 List of companies of Taiwan
 Asus
 Biostar
 Elitegroup Computer Systems (ECS)
 Gigabyte Technology
 Micro-Star International (MSI)

Notes

References

External links 

 

2002 establishments in Taiwan
Companies based in Taipei
Computer enclosure companies
Electronics companies of Taiwan
Manufacturing companies established in 2002
Motherboard companies
Taiwanese brands
Graphics hardware companies
Taiwanese companies established in 2002